The Hadza, or Hadzabe (Wahadzabe, in Swahili), are a protected Hunter-gatherer Tanzanian indigenous ethnic group from Baray ward in southwest Karatu District of Arusha Region. They live around Lake Eyasi basin in the central Rift Valley and in the neighboring Serengeti Plateau. There are, as of 2015, between 1,200 and 1,300 Hadza people living in Tanzania, however only around 400 Hadza still survive exclusively based on the traditional means of foraging. Additionally, the increasing impact of tourism and encroaching pastoralists pose serious threats to the continuation of their traditional way of life.

Overview
Genetically, the Hadza are not closely related to any other people. Once classified among the Khoisan languages, primarily because it has clicks, the Hadza language (Hadzane) is actually thought to be an isolate, unrelated to any other. Hadzane is an entirely oral language, but it is not predicted to be in danger of extinction. UNESCO states that the language is not endangered but vulnerable because most children learn it but the use is restricted to certain areas of life, for example to the home. Hadzane is also considered the most important factor of distinguishing who is and is not actually a part of the Hadza people. In more recent years, many of the Hadza have learned Swahili, the national language of Tanzania, as a second language.

As descendants of Tanzania's aboriginal, pre-Bantu expansion hunter-gatherer population, they have probably occupied their current territory for thousands of years, with relatively little modification to their basic way of life until the past hundred years.

Since the 18th century, the Hadza have come into increasing contact with farming and herding people entering Hadzaland and its vicinity; the interactions were often hostile and caused population decline in the late 19th century. The first European contact and written accounts of the Hadza are from the late 19th century. Since then, there have been many attempts by successive colonial administrations, the independent Tanzanian government, and foreign missionaries to settle the Hadza, by introducing farming and Christianity. These efforts have largely failed, and many Hadza still pursue virtually the same way of life as their ancestors are described as having in early 20th-century accounts. In recent years, they have been under pressure from neighboring groups encroaching on their land, and also have been affected by tourism and safari hunting.

History

Oral tradition 
One telling of Hadza's oral history divides their past into four epochs, each inhabited by a different culture. According to this tradition, in the beginning of time the world was inhabited by hairy giants called the akakaanebee "first ones" or geranebee "ancient ones". The akakaanebee did not possess tools or fire; they hunted game by running it down until it fell dead; they ate the meat raw. They did not build houses but slept under trees, as the Hadza do today in the dry season. In older versions of this story, fire was not used because it was physically impossible in the earth's primeval state, while younger Hadza, who have been to school, say that the akakaanebee simply did not know how.

In the second epoch, the akakaanebee were succeeded by the xhaaxhaanebee "in-between ones", equally gigantic but without hair. Fire could be made and used to cook meat, but animals had grown more wary of humans and had to be chased and hunted with dogs. The xhaaxhaanebee were the first people to use medicines and charms to protect themselves from enemies and initiated the  rite. They lived in caves.

The third epoch was inhabited by the people of hamakwanebee "recent days", who were smaller than their predecessors. They invented bows and arrows, and containers for cooking, and mastered the use of fire. They also built huts like those of Hadza today. The people of hamakwabee were the first of the Hadza ancestors to have contact with non-foraging people, with whom they traded for iron to make knives and arrowheads. They also invented the gambling game lukuchuko.

The fourth epoch continues today and is inhabited by the hamayishonebee "those of today". When discussing the hamayishonebee epoch, people often mention specific names and places, and can approximately say how many generations ago events occurred.

Archaeology and genetic history
The Hadza are not closely related to any other people. The Hadza language was once classified with the Khoisan languages because it has clicks; however, since there is no evidence they are related, Hadza is now considered an isolate. Genetic testing also suggests significant admixture has occurred between the Hadza and Bantu, while minor admixture with the Nilotic and Cushitic-speaking populations has occurred in the last few thousand years. Today, a few Hadza women marry into neighbouring groups such as the Bantu Isanzu and the Nilotic Datoga, but these marriages often fail and the woman and her children return to the Hadza. In previous decades, rape or capture of Hadza women by outsiders seems to have been common. During a famine in 1918–20 some Hadza men were reported as taking Isanzu wives.

The Hadza's ancestors have probably lived in their current territory for tens of thousands of years. Archaeological evidence suggests that the area has been continuously occupied by hunter gatherers much like the Hadza since at least the beginning of the Later Stone Age, 50,000 years ago. Although the Hadza do not make rock art today, they consider several rock art sites within their territory, probably at least 2,000 years old, to have been created by their ancestors, and their oral history does not suggest they moved to Hadzaland from elsewhere.

The Hadza population is dominated by haplogroup B2-M112 (Y-DNA). There are also Y-haplogroups haplogroup E-V38(Y-DNA) and haplogroup E-M215(Y-DNA).

Precolonial period
Until about 500 BCE, Tanzania was exclusively occupied by hunter-gatherers akin to the Hadza. The first agriculturalists to enter the region were Cushitic-speaking cattle herders from the Horn of Africa. Around 500 CE the Bantu expansion reached Tanzania, bringing populations of farmers with iron tools and weapons. The last major ethnic group to enter the region were Nilotic pastoralists who migrated south from Sudan in the 18th century. Each of these expansions of farming and herding peoples displaced earlier populations of hunter-gatherers, who would have generally been at a demographic and technological disadvantage, and vulnerable to the loss of environment resources (i.e., foraging areas and habitats for game) as a result of the spread of farmland and pastures. Therefore, groups such as the Hadza and the Sandawe are remnants of indigenous hunter-gatherer populations that were once much more widespread, and are under pressure from the continued expansion of agriculture into areas which they have traditionally occupied.

Farmers and herders appeared in the vicinity of Hadzaland relatively recently. The pastoralist Iraqw and Datoga were both forced to migrate into the area by the expansion of the Maasai, the former in the 19th century and the latter in the 1910s. The Isanzu, a Bantu farming people, began living just south of Hadzaland around 1850. The Hadza also have contact with the Maasai and the Sukuma west of Lake Eyasi. The Hadza's interaction with many of these peoples has been hostile. In particular, the upheavals caused by the Maasai expansion in the late 19th century caused a decline in the Hadza population. Pastoralists often killed Hadza as reprisals for the "theft" of livestock, since the Hadza did not have the notion of animal ownership, and would hunt them as they would wild game.

The Isanzu were also hostile to the Hadza at times, and may have captured them for the slave trade until as late as the 1870s (when it was halted by the German colonial government). Later interaction was more peaceable, with the two peoples sometimes intermarrying and residing together, though as late as 1912, the Hadza were reported as being "ready for war" with the Isanzu. The Sukuma and the Hadza had a more amiable relationship; the Sukuma drove their herds and salt caravans through Hadza lands, and exchanged old metal tools, which the Hadza made into arrowheads, for the right to hunt elephants in Hadzaland. The general attitude of neighboring agro-pastoralists towards the Hadza was prejudicial; they viewed them as backwards, not possessing a "real language", and made up of the dispossessed of neighboring tribes that had fled into the forest out of poverty or because they committed a crime. Many of these misconceptions were transmitted to early colonial visitors to the region who wrote about the Hadza.

20th century

In the late 19th century, European powers claimed much of the African continent as colonies, a period known as the Scramble for Africa. The Hadza became part of German East Africa, though at the time the colony was proclaimed there is no evidence that Hadzaland had ever been visited by Europeans. The earliest mention of the Hadza in a written account is in German explorer Oscar Baumann's Durch Massailand zur Nilquelle (1894). The Hadza hid from Baumann and other early explorers, and their descriptions are based on second hand accounts.

The first Europeans to report actually meeting the Hadza are Otto Dempwolff and Erich Obst. The latter lived with them for eight weeks in 1911. German Tanganyika came under British control at the end of the First World War (1917), and soon after the Hadza were written about by British colonial officer F. J. Bagshawe. The accounts of these early European visitors portray the Hadza at the beginning of the 20th century as living in much the same way as they do today. Early on Obst noted a distinction between the 'pure' Hadza (that is, those subsisting purely by hunting and gathering) and those that lived with the Isanzu and practised some cultivation.

The foraging Hadza exploited the same foods using many of the same techniques they do today, though game was more plentiful because farmers had not yet begun directly encroaching on their lands. Some early reports describe the Hadza as having chiefs or big men, but they were probably mistaken; more reliable accounts portray early 20th century Hadza as egalitarian, as they are today. They also lived in similarly sized camps, used the same tools, built houses in the same style and had similar religious beliefs.

The British colonial government tried to make the Hadza settle down and adopt farming in 1927, the first of many government attempts to do so. The British tried again in 1939, as did the independent Tanzanian government in 1965 and 1990, and various foreign missionary groups since the 1960s. Despite numerous attempts, some forceful, all have largely failed. Generally, the Hadza willingly settle for a time while the provided food stocks last, then leave and resume their traditional hunter-gatherer life when the provisions run out; few have adopted farming as a way of life. Disease is also a problem – 

Of the four villages built for the Hadza since 1965, two (Yaeda Chini and Munguli) are now inhabited by the Isanzu, Iraqw and Datoga. Another, Mongo wa Mono, established in 1988, is sporadically occupied by Hadza groups who stay there for a few months at a time, either farming, foraging or to utilize the food given to them by missionaries. At the fourth village, Endamagha (also known as Mwonyembe), the school is attended by Hadza children, but they account for just a third of the students there. Numerous attempts to convert the Hadza to Christianity have also been largely unsuccessful.

Tanzanian farmers began moving into the Mangola area to grow onions in the 1940s, but came in small numbers until the 1960s. The first German plantation in Hadzaland was established in 1928, and later three European families settled in the area. Since the 1960s, the Hadza have been visited regularly by anthropologists, linguists, geneticists and other researchers.

Present
In recent years, the Hadza's territory has seen increasing encroachment from neighboring peoples. The western Hadza lands are now a private hunting reserve, and the Hadza are officially restricted to a reservation within the reserve and prohibited from hunting there. The Yaeda Valley, long uninhabited due to the tsetse fly, is now occupied by Datooga herders, who are clearing the Hadza lands on either side of the now fully settled valley for pasture for their goats and cattle. The Datooga hunt out the game, and their land clearing destroys the berries, tubers, and honey that the Hadza rely on, along with watering holes for their cattle causing the shallow watering holes the Hadza rely on to dry up. Most Hadzabe are no longer able to sustain themselves in the bush without supplementary food such as ugali.

After documentaries on the Hadza on PBS and the BBC in 2001, the Mang'ola Hadza have become a tourist attraction. Although on the surface this may appear to help the Hadzabe, much of the money from tourism is allocated by government offices and tourism companies rather than going to the Hadzabe. Money given directly to Hadzabe also contributes to alcoholism and deaths from alcohol poisoning have recently become a severe problem, further contributing to the loss of cultural knowledge.

In 2007, the local government controlling the Hadza lands adjacent to the Yaeda Valley leased the entire  of land to the Al Nahyan royal family of the United Arab Emirates for use as a "personal safari playground". Both the Hadza and Datooga were evicted, with some Hadza resisters imprisoned. However, after protests from the Hadza and negative coverage in the international press, the deal was rescinded.

Range

There are four traditional areas of Hadza dry-season habitation: West of the southern end of Lake Eyasi (Dunduhina), between Lake Eyasi and the Yaeda Valley swamp to the east (Tlhiika), east of the Yaeda Valley in the Mbulu Highlands (Siponga), and north of the valley around the town of Mang'ola (Mangola). During the wet season the Hadza camp outside and between these areas, and readily travel between them during the dry season as well. Access to and from the western area is by crossing the southern end of the lake, which is the first part to dry up, or by following the escarpment of the Serengeti Plateau around the northern shore. The Yaeda Valley is easily crossed, and the areas on either side abut the hills south of Mang'ola.

The Hadza have traditionally foraged outside these areas, in the Yaeda Valley, on the slopes of Mount Oldeani north of Mang'ola, and up onto the Serengeti Plains. Such foraging is done for hunting, berry collecting, and for honey. Although hunting is illegal in the Serengeti, the Tanzanian authorities recognize that the Hadza are a special case and do not enforce the regulations with them, just as the Hadza are the only people in Tanzania not taxed locally or by the national government.

Social structure

The Hadza are organized into bands, called 'camps' in the literature, of typically 20–30 people, though camps of over a hundred may form during berry season. There is no tribal or other governing hierarchy, and almost all decisions are made by reaching an agreement through discussion. Furthermore, the Hadza are egalitarian, meaning there are no real status differences between individuals. While the elderly receive slightly more respect, within groups of age and sex all individuals are equal, and compared to strictly stratified societies, women are considered fairly equal. This egalitarianism results in high levels of freedom and self-dependency. When conflict does arise, it may be resolved by one of the parties voluntarily moving to another camp. Ernst Fehr and Urs Fischbacher point out that the Hadza people “exhibit a considerable amount of altruistic punishment” to organize these tribes. The Hadza live in a communal setting and engage in cooperative child rearing, where many individuals (both related and unrelated) provide high quality care for children.

The Hadza move camp for a number of reasons. Conflict is resolved primarily by leaving camp, and camps frequently split for this reason. Camps are abandoned when someone falls ill and dies, as illness is associated with the place they fell ill. There is also seasonal migration between dry-season refuges, better hunting grounds while water is more abundant, and areas with large numbers of tubers or berry trees when they are in season. If a man kills a particularly large animal such as a giraffe far from home, a camp will temporarily relocate to the kill site (smaller animals are brought back to the camp). Shelters can be built in a few hours, and most of the possessions owned by an individual can be carried on their backs.

Having no tribal or governing hierarchy, the Hadza trace descent bilaterally (through paternal and maternal lines), and almost all Hadza can trace some kin tie to all other Hadza people.

The Hadza are predominantly monogamous, though there is no social enforcement of monogamy. After marriage, the husband and wife are free to live where they decide, which may be with the father or mother's family. This marital residence pattern is called ambilocality, and is common among foragers. Specifically among Hadza, there is a slightly higher frequency of married couples living with the mother's kin rather than the father's kin. While men and women value traits such as hard work when evaluating for partners, they also value physical attractiveness. In fact, many of their preferences for attractiveness, such as symmetry, averageness and sexually dimorphic voice pitch are similar to preferences found in Western nations.

A 2001 anthropological study on modern foragers found the Hadza to have an average life expectancy of 33 at birth for both men and women. Life expectancy at age 20 was 39 and the infant mortality rate was 21%. More recently, Hadza adults have frequently lived into their sixties, and some have even reached their seventies or eighties. However, Hadza do not keep track of time and age exactly as the Western world does, and therefore these life expectancies are approximate and highly variable.

Subsistence

Hadza men usually forage individually, and during the course of the day usually feed themselves while foraging, and also bring home some honey, fruit, or wild game when available. Women forage in larger parties, and usually bring home berries, baobab fruit, and tubers, depending on availability. Men and women also forage cooperatively for honey and fruit, and at least one adult male will usually accompany a group of foraging women. During the wet season, the diet is composed mostly of honey, some fruit, tubers, and occasional meat. The contribution of meat to the diet increases in the dry season, when game become concentrated around sources of water. During this time, men often hunt in pairs, and spend entire nights lying in wait by waterholes, hoping to shoot animals that approach for a night-time drink, with bows and arrows treated with poison. The poison is made of the branches of the shrub Adenium coetaneum. The Hadza are highly skilled, selective, and opportunistic foragers, and adjust their diet according to season and circumstance. Depending on local availability, some groups might rely more heavily on tubers, others on berries, others on meat. This variability is the result of their opportunism and adjustment to prevailing conditions.

Traditionally, the Hadza do not make use of hunting dogs, although this custom has been recently borrowed from neighboring tribes to some degree. Most men (80%+) do not use dogs when foraging.

Women's foraging technology includes the digging stick, grass baskets for carrying berries, large fabric or skin pouches for carrying items, knives, shoes, other clothing, and various small items held in a pouch around the neck. Men carry axes, bows, poisoned and non-poisoned arrows, knives, small honey pots, fire drills, shoes and apparel, and various small items.

While men specialize in procuring meat, honey, and baobab fruit, women specialize in tubers, berries, and greens. This division of labor is rather apparent, but women will occasionally gather a small animal or egg, or gather honey, and men will occasionally bring a tuber or some berries back to camp.

A myth depicts a woman harvesting the honey of wild bees, and at the same time, it declares that the job of honey harvesting belongs to the men. For harvesting honey or fruit from large trees such as the baobab, the Hadza beat pointed sticks into the trunk of the tree as ladders. This technique is depicted in a tale, and it is also documented in film.

There exists a dynamic relationship of mutualism and manipulation between a wild bird, the Greater honeyguide (Indicator indicator) and the Hadza. In order to obtain wax, the bird guides people to the nests of wild bees (i.e. Apis mellifera). Hadza men whistle, strike trees, and sometimes shout to attract and keep the attention of the honeyguide. The bird also calls to attract the honey-hunter, using a distinctive chatter. Once the honey-hunter has located the bee nest, he uses smoke to subdue the bees, and his axe to chop into the tree and open the bee nest. The honey hunter eats or carries away most of the liquid honey, and the honeyguide consumes beeswax that may be left adhering to the tree, or which has been spit out or otherwise discarded at the site of acquisition. In many cases, instead of actively feeding the honeyguide, Hadza men burn, bury, or hide the wax that remains at the harvest site, in order to keep the honeyguide hungry, and more likely to guide again. The honeyguide also appears in Hadza mythology, both in naturalistic and personified forms. Honey represents a substantial portion of the Hadza diet (~10-20% of calories) and is an important food for many hunter-gatherer societies living in the tropics. The increased consumption of bee products contributed to an improvement in the energy density of the human diet during evolution.

The Hadza consume tubers and fruit from baobab trees, giving about 100 to 150 grams of fiber each day.

Religion, myths, and tales

Religion 
The Hadza do not follow a formal religion, and it has been claimed that they do not believe in an afterlife. They offer prayers to Ishoko (the Sun) or to Haine (the husband of Ishoko) during a hunt and believe they go to Ishoko when they die, they also hold rituals such as the monthly  dance for men at the new moon and the less frequent  circumcision and coming-of-age ceremony for women.

Epeme 
 can be understood as the Hadza's concept of manhood, hunting, and the relationships between sexes. "True" adult men are called  men, which they become by killing large game, usually in their early 20s. Being an  comes with an advantage—only  men are allowed to eat certain parts of large game animals, such as warthog, giraffe, buffalo, wildebeest, and lion. The parts of these animals that are typically considered  are the kidney, lung, heart, neck, tongue, and genitals. Also, no one besides other  men are allowed to be present for the  meat-eating. If a man still has not killed a large game animal by his thirties, he will automatically be considered  and will be allowed to eat the  meat.

In addition to eating  meat, the  men participate in an  dance. In Jon Yates's summary of Frank Marlowe's account, this dance occurs every night when the moon isn't visible, and must occur in near-complete darkness, with camp-fires extinguished.
To begin the ritual, the women separate from the men and sit where they cannot be seen. The men gather behind a tree or hut and prepare for the dance. In the pitch dark, as the women begin to sing, the first man starts to dance. He wears a headdress of dark ostrich feathers, on one of his ankles are bells, a rattle is in his hand and a long, black cape on his back. In time with the women's singing, he stamps his right foot hard on the ground, causing the bells to ring, while marking the beat of the music with his rattle. He sings out to the women, who answer in a call and response. As the singing grows in strength, the women rise to join the man, who continues to dance—committing his efforts to a family member, one of the women, a friend or one of his children. At this point, the child may join the dance as well. After each man has danced the epeme two or three times, the ritual is finished, by which time it is close to midnight.The ritual has been show to promote social cohesion among the Hadza, with people who share the epeme dance showing elevate levels of mutual trust and support.

Mythological figures with celestial connotations 

There are some mythological figures who are believed to take part in arranging the world, for example rolling the sky and the earth like two sheets of leather and swapping their order to achieve the recent situation—in the past the sky used to be located under the earth. These figures also have made crucial decisions about the animals and humans (designating their food, environment), giving people the fire and the capability of sitting. These figures have celestial connotations: Ishoko is a solar figure, Haine is a lunar figure.

Ishoko ("sun") 
The character "Ishoye" seems to be Ishoko. She is depicted in some tales as someone who created animals, even people. Her creatures included also some people who later turned out to be a disaster for their fellow people (the man-eating giant and his wife): as Ishoko saw this, she killed the man-eaters: "you are not people any longer".

Uttering Ishoko's name can mean a greeting, a good wish to someone for a successful hunt.

Ishoko is the wife of Haine.

Roles of a culture hero

The man who returned from the grave to become a hero 

Indaya, the man who went to the Isanzu territory after his death and returned, plays the role of a culture hero: he introduces customs and goods to the Hadza.

Isanzu people 

The Isanzu people neighbor the Hadza. Unlike the Iraqw and the cattle-raiding Maasai (who used to lead raids towards Isanzu and Iramba through Hadza territory), the hoe-farming Isanzu are regarded as a peaceful people by Hadza. Moreover, many goods and customs comes from them, and the Hadza myths mention and depict this benevolent influence of the Isanzu. This advantageous view about Isanzu makes the role of this people comparable to that of a culture hero in Hadza folklore.

Also in some of the mythical stories about giants (see below), it is an Isanzu man who liberates the Hadza from the malevolent giant.

Stories about giants 

The stories about giants describe people with superhuman strength and size, but otherwise with human weaknesses (they have human needs, eat and drink, they can be poisoned or cheated).

Sengani and his brothers 

One of the giants, Sengani (or Sengane), was Haine's helper, and Haine gave him power to rule over people. In Haine's absence, the giant endangered people with his decisions. The people had to resist him, thus the giant ordered the lions to attack people, which surprised people, because formerly lions were regarded as harmless beings. The people killed the giant in revenge.

This giant had brothers, rendered "Ssaabo" and "Waonelakhi" in Kohl-Larsen. Several tales describe the disaster these giants caused to Hadza by constantly killing, beating them. The Hadza had to ask for help from neighboring groups, finally, the giants were tricked and poisoned, or shot to death by arrows treated with poison.

Man-eating giant 

A man-eating giant, rendered "!esengego" by Kohl-Larsen, and his family were killed by a benevolent snake. The snake turned out to be the remedy applied by Ishoko to liberate people. Ishoko changed the corpses of the giant family into leopards. He prohibited them to attack people, except for the case they would be provoked or wounded by an arrow.

!Hongongoschá 

Another giant, rendered "!Hongongoschá" in Kohl-Larsen, played the role of a mythological figure. He did not bother the Hadza (except for some smaller thefts done secretly at night). His nourishment was flowers of trees (and stolen vegetables). People greeted him with great respect, and the giant wished them good hunting luck. The giant provided further his good will to people even after he was hurt deliberately by a boy, but he took a fatal revenge on the boy. Finally, the god Haine decided about the fate of this giant and the people: he warned people, revealed the malevolent deed of the boy, and changed the giant into a big white clam.

See also
Aka people
Baka people
Bushmen
Bongo people
!Kung people
Mbuti people
Twa peoples

Notes

References

 
 
 
 
  
 
  
  A film (43 min) in German about this people and their struggle for survival.
  The book is a collection of Hadza myths about giants, also some tribal myths about cultural heroes, and anecdotal tales.
 
 
 
 
 
 
  This book includes descriptions of Hadza myths, culture, and modern struggles.

Further reading
 
 
 
 
 
 Matthiessen, Peter (1972) The Tree Where Man Was Born, Chapter X.

External links

 Hadza bibliography, Electronic Bibliography for African Languages and Linguistics
 Gli ultimi primitivi. Alla scoperta degli Hadzabe Documentary film (in Italian).
 Hadzabe. Retour vers l'âge de pierre. Les derniers chasseurs à l'arc de Tanzanie Documentary film (in French).
 The Hadza Bushmen of Tanzania
 Map of Hadzaland
  

Ethnic groups in Tanzania
Indigenous peoples of East Africa
Hunter-gatherers of Africa